Patrick McDermott was an American cameraman who disappeared in June 2005.

Patrick McDermott may also refer to: 
 Patrick McDermott (politician) (1859–1942), Irish nationalist politician